CosmoBot is a prototype telerehabilitation robot designed to treat children with disabilities such as Autism Spectrum disorders, Down Syndrome, cerebral palsy, muscular dystrophy, apraxia, neurodevelopmental disorders, and language developmental disorders.

See also
 Autism therapies
 Autism friendly
 Educational Psychology
 Physical Therapy
 Telerobotics
 Voice command device

References

 Brisben, A. J., Lockerd, A. D., & Lathan, C. (Jun, 2004). Design evolution of an interactive robot for therapy. Telemedicine Journal and e-Health. 10, 252–259.
 Lathan, C., Brisben, A., & Safos, C. (April 2005). CosmoBot levels the playing field for disabled children. Interactions -- Special Issue: Robots!. 12, 14–16.
 Lathan, C.E., Tracey, M. R., Vice, J.M., Druin, A., & Plaisant, C. Robotic Apparatus and Wireless Communication System, US Patent Application 10/085, 821 filed February 27, 2002

External links
 AT Kid Systems
 RERC on Telerehabilitation

Telerehabilitation
Therapeutic robots
1999 robots
Robots of the United States
Humanoid robots
Rolling robots